Sumter County is a county located in the west-central portion of the U.S. state of Georgia. As of the 2020 census, its population was 29,616. The county seat is Americus. The county was created on December 26, 1831.

Sumter County is part of the Americus micropolitan statistical area.

History

Foundation and antebellum years 
Sumter County was established by an act of the state legislature on December 26, 1831, four years after the Creek Indians were forced from the region when the state acquired the territory from them in the 1825 Treaty of Indian Springs. Sumter, the state's 80th county, was created after population increases by a division of Lee County, now situated to its south. The county was named for former General and United States Senator Thomas Sumter (1734–1832) of South Carolina. When the county was organized, Sumter was 97 years old and the last surviving general of the American Revolution (1775–1783).

Shortly thereafter, a committee chose a central site for the county seat, and laid out what became the town of Americus. Many of the county's earliest white residents acquired their land through an 1827 state land lottery. Like many other white settlers, they quickly developed their property for cotton cultivation. Since the invention of the cotton gin at the end of the 18th century, short-staple cotton was the crop of choice throughout the Black Belt of the South.

The rich, black soil, combined with ready market access via the Flint River (bordering the county on the east) or the Chattahoochee River (farther west), put Sumter among the state's most prosperous Black Belt counties by the 1840s and 1850s. Cotton agriculture was economically dependent on enslaved African Americans. By the 1850 census, the demographic makeup of the county had become 6,469 whites, 3,835 slaves, and 18 free people of color. By the 1860 census, the county had 4,536 whites, 4,890 slaves and two free people of color.

Civil War years
During the American Civil War (1861–65), the small village named Andersonville, 9 mi (14 km) north of Americus on the county's northern edge, was selected by Confederate authorities as the site for a prisoner-of-war camp. The Andersonville prison was built in neighboring Macon County, and became the largest such prison in the South. During the camp's 14 months of operations, some 45,000 Union prisoners suffered some of the worst conditions and highest casualties of any of the camps. Today, the Andersonville National Historic Site serves as a memorial to all American prisoners of war throughout the nation's history. The  park lies in both Macon and Sumter Counties and consists of the historic prison site and the National Cemetery, which originally was reserved for the Union dead.

Into modernity
Other areas of the county have attracted national attention in the 20th century for very different reasons. In 1942, two Baptist ministers chose a farm in the western part of the county as the location for a Christian commune named Koinonia, where Black and White workers lived and worked together for nearly 50 years, generating some hostility among local residents during its early years.

Sumter County counts a U.S. President among its native sons. Jimmy Carter was born and raised on a peanut farm in Plains, a small community on the county's western edge. His election to the presidency in 1976 brought the small town considerable attention from journalists and tourists, which it continues to receive as the former President and his wife, and much of their family, still make Plains their home. Carter's birthplace and childhood home has been designated a National Historic Site, and is open for tours.

The headquarters of Habitat for Humanity International, a nonprofit organization whose mission is to eliminate homelessness, is located in Americus, the home of its founder, Millard Fuller. In addition to Habitat's socially impactful activities, Koinonia Partners publishes a bimonthly newsletter for the Prison and Jail Project promoting prisoner reform and education. Americus is also home to two colleges. Georgia Southwestern State University, a public four-year institution established in 1906, is part of the University System of Georgia. South Georgia Technical College, which stands near Souther Field, was a training base for American and British aviators during World War I (1917–18). Charles Lindbergh learned to fly here and assembled a military surplus "Jenny" aircraft with the help of mechanics at Souther Field. Downtown Americus boasts two prominent examples of historic restoration: the Windsor Hotel, built in 1892, and the Rylander Theatre, which originally opened in 1921.

Geography

Muckalee Creek flows through Sumter County, which also contains Lake Blackshear and Kinchafoonee Creek.

The western two-thirds of Sumter County, from northeast of Americus to southwest of Leslie, is located in the Kinchafoonee-Muckalee subbasin of the ACF River Basin (Apalachicola-Chattahoochee-Flint River Basin). The eastern third of the county is located in the Middle Flint River subbasin of the same ACF River Basin.

Major highways

  U.S. Route 19
  U.S. Route 280
  State Route 3
  State Route 27
  State Route 30
  State Route 45
  State Route 49
  State Route 118
  State Route 153
  State Route 195
  State Route 228
  State Route 271
  State Route 308
  State Route 377

Adjacent counties

 Macon County (northeast)
 Dooly County (east)
 Crisp County (southeast)
 Lee County (south)
 Terrell County (southwest)
 Webster County (west)
 Marion County (northwest)
 Schley County (north)

National protected areas
 Andersonville National Historic Site (part)
 Jimmy Carter National Historic Site

Demographics

2000 census
As of the census of 2000,  33,200 people, 12,025 households, and 8,501 families were living in the county. The population density was 68 people/sq mi mile (26/km2). The 13,700 housing units averaged 28/sq mi (11/km2). The racial makeup of the county was 48.22% White, 49.02% African American, 0.30% Native American, 0.59% Asian, 1.28% from other races, and 0.59% from two or more races. About 2.68% of the population were Hispanics or Latinos of any race.

Of the 12,025 households, 34.5% had children under 18 living with them, 44.5% were married couples living together, 22.0% had a female householder with no husband present, and 29.3% were not families. About 25.0% of all households were made up of individuals, and 8.9% had someone living alone who was 65 or older. The average household size was 2.64 and the average family size was 3.15.

In the county, the age distribution was 27.8% under 18, 11.9% from 18 to 24, 27.4% from 25 to 44, 20.6% from 45 to 64, and 12.3% who were 65  or older.  The median age was 33 years. For every 100 females, there were 88.20 males.  For every 100 females age 18 and over, there were 81.90 males.

The median income for a household in the county was $30,904, and for a family was $35,379. Males had a median income of $27,828 versus $20,439 for females. The per capita income for the county was $15,083.  About 17.60% of families and 21.40% of the population were below the poverty line, including 32.30% of those under age 18 and 16.80% of those age 65 or over.

2010 census
As of the 2010 United States Census, 32,819 people, 12,123 households, and 8,153 families wereliving in the county. The racial makeup of the county was 51.8%  African American, 42.2% White, 1.3% Asian, 0.3% American Indian, 3.3% from other races, and 1.2% from two or more races. Those of Hispanic or Latino origin made up 5.2% of the population. In terms of ancestry, 7.3% were American, 6.6% were English, and 5.8% were Irish.

Of the 12,123 households, 35.0% had children under 18 living with them, 39.4% were married couples living together, 23.0% had a female householder with no husband present, 32.7% were not families, and 27.6% of all households were made up of individuals. The average household size was 2.55, and the average family size was 3.11. The median age was 33.8 years.

The median income for a household in the county was $32,430 and or a family was $41,371. Males had a median income of $33,676 versus $27,247 for females. The per capita income for the county was $17,436. About 21.7% of families and 26.9% of the population were below the poverty line, including 37.8% of those under age 18 and 14.1% of those age 65 or over.

2020 census

As of the 2020 United States census, there were 29,616 people, 11,510 households, and 7,256 families residing in the county.

Economy
Sumter remains largely a rural county. According to USDA/Georgia Agricultural Statistics Service 2001 figures, cotton remains its major crop, with up to  under cultivation, followed by wheat, peanuts, and corn, which when combined, roughly equal the county's acreage in cotton.

Its major employers include Cooper Lighting, Georgia Southwestern State University, Magnolia Manor, Phoebe Sumter Medical Center, and Walmart.

Communities
 Americus (county seat)
 Andersonville
 Cobb
 De Soto
 Leslie
 Plains

Politics
Sumter County is a swing county in presidential elections. Since 1960, it has voted Democratic eight times, including in 1976, when Sumter County native Jimmy Carter was elected, Republican six times, and for a third-party candidate (George Wallace) once. The last candidate to carry the county by more than 10 points was Bill Clinton in 1996.

The county voted for the winner of the presidential election each year from 1984 to 2012, sticking with the Democrats (Carter's party) in 2016 when Hillary Clinton won a plurality of the vote.

Education
Sumter County School District operates public schools.

Southland Academy is a private school in Americus.

See also

 National Register of Historic Places listings in Sumter County, Georgia
List of counties in Georgia

References

Further reading

 Jimmy Carter, An Hour Before Daylight: Memories of a Rural Boyhood (New York: Simon and Schuster, 2001).
 Jack F. Cox, History of Sumter County, Georgia (Roswell, Ga.: W. H. Wolfe, 1983).
 Freedomways: A Newsletter of the Prison and Jail Project (Americus, Ga.: Koinonia Partners, 1995– ).
 William Marvel, Andersonville: The Last Depot (Chapel Hill: University of North Carolina Press, 1994).

 
Georgia (U.S. state) counties
1831 establishments in Georgia (U.S. state)
Populated places established in 1831
Americus, Georgia micropolitan area
Articles containing material imported from the New Georgia Encyclopedia
Black Belt (U.S. region)
Majority-minority counties in Georgia